In mathematics, pseudo-Zernike polynomials are well known and widely used in the analysis of optical systems. They are also widely used in image analysis as shape descriptors.

Definition 
They are an orthogonal set of complex-valued polynomials
defined as

where  and orthogonality on the unit disk is given as

where the star means complex conjugation, and
are the standard transformations between polar and Cartesian coordinates.

The radial polynomials  are defined as

with integer coefficients

Examples
Examples are:

Moments
The pseudo-Zernike Moments (PZM) of order  and repetition  are defined as

where , and  takes on positive and negative integer

The image function can be reconstructed by expansion of the pseudo-Zernike coefficients on the unit disk as

Pseudo-Zernike moments are derived from conventional Zernike moments and shown
to be more robust and less sensitive to image noise than the Zernike moments.

See also
Zernike polynomials
Image moment

References

 
 
 
 
 
 

Orthogonal polynomials